Diagramma punctatum is a species of marine ray-finned fish, a sweetlips belonging to the family Haemulidae. It is found in the western Indian Ocean, including the Red Sea and Socotra. This species was first formally described in 1830 by Georges Cuvier with the type locality given as the Red Sea. The specific name means “spotted” and refers to the spots on the heads of the adults and subadults.

References

Fish described in 1830
punctatum